Ibréhima Coulibaly (born 30 August 1989) is a professional footballer who plays as a midfielder for FC Nouadhibou. Born in France, he represents Mauritania internationally.

Club career
Coulibaly spent his whole youth career with the CO Les Ulis youth academy, before joining Orléans at the age of 21. He joined USL Dunkerque in 2014 and then moved to Grenoble Foot 38 in 2016. He signed his first professional contract on 2 July 2018 with Grenbole. His professional debut for the club came in a 1–0 Ligue 2 win over FC Sochaux-Montbéliard on 27 July 2018.

In June 2020, Coulibaly joined Le Mans. He left the club in the summer 2022. At the end of October 2022, Coulibaly moved to his native country, Mauritania, to play for FC Nouadhibou.

International career
Born in France, Coulibaly is of Mauritanian descent. He made his debut for the Mauritania national football team on 26 March 2019, in a friendly against Ghana.

He played for the national team at the African Cup of Nations 2019, the first international tournament of the team

References

External links

 
 
 

1989 births
Living people
Sportspeople from Créteil
Association football midfielders
Citizens of Mauritania through descent
Mauritanian footballers
Mauritania international footballers
French footballers
French sportspeople of Mauritanian descent
Grenoble Foot 38 players
US Orléans players
USL Dunkerque players
Le Mans FC players
FC Nouadhibou players
Ligue 2 players
Championnat National players
Championnat National 2 players
2019 Africa Cup of Nations players
2021 Africa Cup of Nations players
Footballers from Val-de-Marne